Eleutherodactylus zugi is a species of frog in the family Eleutherodactylidae. It is endemic to western Cuba and is known from Pinar del Río and Artemisa provinces. The specific name zugi honors , an American herpetologist. Common names Rosario red-legged frog and Zug's robber frog have been coined for it. Eleutherodactylus erythroproctus was originally described as a subspecies of Eleutherodactylus zugi, and is sometimes still treated as such.

Description
Eleutherodactylus zugi is a small species: adult males measure  and adult females  in snout–vent length. The snout is rather acute. The tympanum is visible and larger in females than in males of the same size. The fingers and toes are short and have no webbing. The dorsum is warty, including a raised middorsal line. The throat and the venter are smooth. There are three basic color patterns. The first type has a dark brown to tan middorsal zone that is bounded by a broad yellow or orange dorsolateral stripe. The second type has a pair of dorsolateral stripes that end dorsally, and a thin middorsal line. The third type has a mottled dorsum, without indications of dorsolateral bands or stripes.

Habitat and conservation
The type series was collected from wet shrubs few inches above the ground, and under less wet conditions, under palm trash and other debris. At night they may climb on moist rocks. The eggs are deposited on the ground. Development is direct, without free-living larval stage.

Eleutherodactylus zugi is a rare species with a restricted range. It is threatened by habitat loss caused by agriculture, infrastructure development, and tourism. Agricultural pollution may also be a threat. The range of this species overlaps with several protected areas, but many of these would require improved management.

References

zugi
Endemic fauna of Cuba
Amphibians of Cuba
Amphibians described in 1958
Taxa named by Albert Schwartz (zoologist)
Taxonomy articles created by Polbot